Raúl Moreno Artalejo (born 21 November 1979) is a Spanish former footballer who played as a goalkeeper.

Club career
Born in Madrid, Moreno spent the vast majority of his career in the Segunda División B after starting out at local club CF Fuenlabrada. After three years with Valencia CF's reserves, he signed with CD Leganés – also in his native region – in 2005, with whom he appeared in the 2009 promotion play-offs, being sent off in the match against Real Jaén.

Moreno's input at the professional level consisted of two Segunda División matches for AD Alcorcón, both in the 2010–11 season (he added four appearances in the Copa del Rey). He was part of SD Ponferradina's second-tier squad in the second part of the 2013–14 campaign, but did not receive any playing time.

References

External links

1979 births
Living people
Spanish footballers
Footballers from Madrid
Association football goalkeepers
Segunda División players
Segunda División B players
Divisiones Regionales de Fútbol players
CF Fuenlabrada B players
CF Fuenlabrada footballers
Valencia CF Mestalla footballers
Cultural Leonesa footballers
CD Leganés players
AD Alcorcón footballers
UD Salamanca players
SD Ponferradina players
Lorca FC players
Mérida AD players
UD San Sebastián de los Reyes players